John Kerr Jr. (February 10, 1811 – September 5, 1879) was a Congressional Representative and jurist from North Carolina.

He was born near Danville, Virginia, February 10, 1811, son of John Kerr.  The younger Kerr completed academic studies in Richmond, Virginia; studied law; and was admitted to the bar and commenced practice in Yanceyville, North Carolina; trustee of Wake Forest College, North Carolina 1844-1856 and of the University of North Carolina at Chapel Hill 1846–1868; unsuccessful Whig candidate for Governor of North Carolina in 1852; elected as a Whig to the Thirty-third Congress (March 4, 1853 – March 3, 1855); unsuccessful candidate for reelection in 1854 to the Thirty-fourth Congress; member of the State house of representatives in 1858 and 1860; judge of the superior court of North Carolina, 1862–1863 and 1874–1879; died in Reidsville, North Carolina, September 5, 1879; interment in the City Cemetery, Yanceyville, N.C.

See also 
 Thirty-third United States Congress

External links
 U.S. Congressional Biographical Directory
 

1811 births
1879 deaths
Wake Forest University people
Members of the North Carolina House of Representatives
North Carolina state court judges
People of North Carolina in the American Civil War
Politicians from Danville, Virginia
Whig Party members of the United States House of Representatives from North Carolina
19th-century American politicians
People from Yanceyville, North Carolina
19th-century American judges